Eursinge is a hamlet in the Dutch province of Drenthe. It is located in the municipality of De Wolden, less than 1 km northwest of the village of Pesse.

References

Populated places in Drenthe
De Wolden